Maureen Ellsworth (born 12 October 1991)  is a Dutch track and field athlete who specializes in the 400 metres. In July 2019 she set her current personal best of 52.90 seconds.

She was 400 m runner-up to Lisanne de Witte at the 2019 Dutch Athletics Championships, coming close to her personal best with 52.92 seconds. As a result she was selected for the 2019 European Team Championships and anchored the Dutch women's 4 × 400 metres relay team to third place in the First League section. Ellsworth was chosen for the relay team at the 2019 World Athletics Championships but ultimately did not compete. Ellsworth ranked third nationally on time for that season, behind de Witte and Madiea Ghafoor.

Personal bests
Outdoor
400 metres – 52.90 (Oordegem 2019)

Indoor
400 metres – 54.15 (Apeldoorn 2019)

References

External links
 

1991 births
Living people
Dutch female sprinters
20th-century Dutch women
21st-century Dutch women